Gamma Rho Lambda is a social, college-based sorority for lesbian, gay, bisexual, transgender, non-binary, and allied students. Gamma Rho Lambda has been referred to as the first national multicultural lesbian sorority; however they are inclusive of cisgender women, trans women, trans men, and gender variant people of all sexualities and racial identities. As of 2019, GRL consists of seventeen active chapters and three colonies across twelve states with an active membership  of over 400, including alumni and collegians.

History
Gamma Rho Lambda, Alpha chapter, was founded in the Fall of 2003 by 12 original members at Arizona State University in Tempe, Arizona. The sorority was initially created because the founding president and members wanted an organization similar to the GBTQ-focused fraternity on campus, Sigma Phi Beta.

2005 to 2010
In 2005, Gamma Rho Lambda began the daunting task of expanding nationally, as Alpha chapter had been approached by several interested women on other campuses in the United States. Over the course of the next year, Gamma Rho Lambda worked to expand to these campuses, functioning in a national and local capacity at the same time.

In 2006, with enough alum members to support a national council, Gamma Rho Lambda National Sorority became independent of Alpha chapter. Since then, the national sorority has been working on expansion, adjusting to the needs of its chapters and members, and bettering the community overall through these efforts.

The sorority expanded to San Diego State University and Georgia Southern University. University of Missouri became a colony. San Diego State University gained chapter status as Beta chapter. Kansas State University became a colony. California State University, Northridge, University of California, Los Angeles, Purdue University and SUNY Albany became colonies. University of Missouri colony disbanded from Gamma Rho Lambda to focus more on political involvement. Kansas State University gained chapter status as Delta chapter  and Purdue University gained chapter status as Eta chapter.

2010 to 2015
Gamma Rho Lambda rapidly expanded during this time. Northern Arizona University, SUNY Albany, University of Houston, UC Berkeley, UC Riverside, Ball State, Tulane University, Iowa State, American University, and University of Iowa became colonies of Gamma Rho Lambda and later chapters  Additionally UL Lafayette and UT Austin were inducted as colonies.

2016 to present
UL Lafayette and UT Austin were initiated as Sigma and Tau chapter, respectively. Longwood University, University of Arizona, and Missouri S&T were initiated as colonies in the spring of 2016 and became chapters in early 2017. Also, Bowling Green State University and Ohio State University were inducted as colonies in the fall of 2016 and became chapters in late 2017. Virginia Commonwealth University was inducted as a colony in 2018.

In January 2021, Gamma Rho Lambda National Sorority opened its membership to people of any and all gender identities, thereby including cisgender men in their siblinghood.

The provisional chapter at University of Nevada, Reno was inducted as Alpha Delta chapter in February 2021. Today, Gamma Rho Lambda active membership (including Alum & Collegians) consists of over 400 active members. 

Gamma Rho Lambda National Sorority's main philanthropic efforts are to benefit The Trevor Project, but chapters may also have locally-based philanthropy.

Symbols
The sorority's official colors are purple and black. The wolf is its symbol and mascot. Its flower is the sunflower. Its motto is: "Truth in tolerance, knowledge through diversity, bonds of unity, strength in trust." 

The  Lambda symbol was adopted by the New York City's Gay Activists' Alliance in the 1970s during the Stonewall Riots. Since then, the Lambda has spread as a symbol for the gay liberation movement. Because of its history, the Lambda was chosen to be a letter in the sorority's Greek name. The Gamma and Rho symbols were chosen because with the Lambda symbol, they spell GR (girl").

Visible symbols in the coat of arms include the lioness, the bear, the unicorn, the crown of thorns, the metal crown, the Isle of Lesbos symbol with shaking hands, the upside down black triangle, the Eye of Horus, the hand, the sword, the ivy leaf vine, the elephant tusk, and the cinquefoil.

Governing council
The sorority's day-to-day business activities are overseen by the National Governing Council which acts as the board of directors. It was established in 2006, when there were enough alumni members to support a National Council. Since then, Gamma Rho Lambda National Sorority has been working not only on expansion, but also adjusting to the needs of our chapters and members and bettering the community overall through these efforts. Council consists of thirteen elected alumnae who are elected every two years; This includes one President, Ten Vice Presidents and two Alumni at Large Delegates. Additionally, each VP has a committee to assist them in projects. Each chapter and colony has a mentor who assists them in any issues and provides guidance as they develop.

Chapters
Active chapters are indicated in bold. Inactive chapters are indicated in italic.

Notes

See also 
 List of LGBT fraternities and sororities
List of social fraternities and sororities

References

LGBT fraternities and sororities
Lesbian organizations in the United States
Transgender organizations in the United States
Fraternities and sororities in the United States
Student organizations established in 2003
2003 establishments in Arizona
LGBT in Arizona